The women's singles tournament of the 2018 BWF World Championships (World Badminton Championships) took place from 30 July to 5 August.

Seeds

The seeding list is based on the World Rankings from 12 July 2018.

  Tai Tzu-ying (quarterfinals)
  Akane Yamaguchi (semifinals)
  P. V. Sindhu (final)
  Ratchanok Intanon (third round)
  Chen Yufei (quarterfinals)
  He Bingjiao (semifinals)
  Carolina Marín (champion)
  Nozomi Okuhara (quarterfinals)

  Sung Ji-hyun (third round)
  Saina Nehwal (quarterfinals)
  Nitchaon Jindapol (third round)
  Zhang Beiwen (third round)
  Michelle Li (second round)
  Aya Ohori (second round)
  Sayaka Sato (third round)
  Cheung Ngan Yi (second round)

Draw

Finals

Top half

Section 1

Section 2

Bottom half

Section 3

Section 4

References

External links
Draw

2018 BWF World Championships
BWF